Summoned is a 2013 American television film written and directed by Peter Sullivan and starring Cuba Gooding Jr., Ashley Scott and Bailey Chase.

Cast
Cuba Gooding Jr. as Detective Callendar
Ashley Scott as Laura Price
Bailey Chase as Detective Michael Lyons
James Hong as Frank
Tichina Arnold as Mylene
Tim Abell as George Harris

References

External links
 
 

2013 television films
American television films
2013 films
2010s English-language films